Ilchigulovo (İlseğol) is a rural locality (a selo) and the administrative centre of Ilchigulovsky Selsoviet, Miyakinsky District, Bashkortostan, Russia. The population was 569 as of 2010. There are 5 streets.

Geography 
Ilchigulovo is located 41 km northeast of Kirgiz-Miyaki (the district's administrative centre) by road. Kunkas is the nearest rural locality.

References 

Rural localities in Miyakinsky District